The 1997 Cleveland mayoral election took place on November 4, 1997, to elect the Mayor of Cleveland, Ohio. Incumbent mayor Michael R. White was reelected to a third consecutive term, defeating city councilwoman Helen Knipe Smith.

The election was officially nonpartisan. Since only two candidates ran, no primary was required to be held. Both candidates were Democrats.

Candidates
Helen Knipe Smith, Cleveland city councilwoman
Michael R. White, incumbent mayor

Results

References

Mayoral election, 1997
Cleveland mayoral
Cleveland
Mayoral elections in Cleveland
Non-partisan elections
Cleveland mayoral election